is a Japanese all-female singing trio. It is a subunit (subgroup) of the girl group Fairies.

The members are Miki, Miria and Mahiro. The names of all three start with the Latin letter M.

Members

Discography

Singles

Music videos

References

External links 
 
 M Three profile on the Oricon website

Fairies (Japanese group)
Japanese pop music groups
Japanese girl groups
Japanese idol groups
Japanese-language singers
Musical groups established in 2013
Avex Group artists
2013 establishments in Japan
Child musical groups
Japanese musical trios
Musical groups from Tokyo